The 1984 Copa de la Liga was the second edition of Copa de la Liga. The competition started on May 4, 1984 and concluded on June 30, 1984. Due to time constraints, saturation and club pressure, the Copa de la Liga only lasted four years since 1982, being cancelled in 1986.

Format
The Copa de la Liga was played by 18 teams of 1983-84 La Liga and 4 winners of 1983 Copa de la Liga of Segunda División,  Segunda División B and Tercera División. All rounds were played over two legs. The team that had the higher aggregate score over the two legs progressed to the next round. The 1983-84 Copa del Rey final teams were exempt until the second round.

La Liga

Other teams
Atlético Madrileño, winner of 1983 Copa de la Liga of Segunda División.
Sporting Gijón Atlético, winner of 1983 Copa de la Liga of Segunda División B group I.
Albacete Balompié, winner of 1983 Copa de la Liga of Segunda División B group II.
Real Madrid Aficionados, winner of 1983 Copa de la Liga of Tercera División

First round
First leg: 4, 6 and 9 May 1984. Second leg: 13, 15 and 23 May 1984.

|}

Second round
First leg: 19 and 20 May 1984. Second leg: 27 and 28 May 1984.

|}
Bye: Real Betis, RCD Español, Sevilla FC, Real Valladolid.

Quarter-finals
First leg: 2 and 3 June 1984. Second leg: 9 and 10 June 1984.

|}

Semi-finals
First leg: 16 June 1984. Second leg: 21 June 1984.

|}

Final

First leg

Second leg

References

External links
RSSSF

Copa de la Liga
1983–84 in Spanish football cups